Isola is an album released in 1997 by the Swedish band Kent. It was followed by an English version in 1998, for which a new song, "Velvet", was recorded.

The ending song from the album, "747", has become a fan favourite and was usually one of the songs Kent used to close their concerts.

Track listing

Swedish version

* "OWC" stands for Off World Colonies, a reference to the film Blade Runner. The song's opening piano line was also inspired from the film's soundtrack, which was composed by Vangelis.

English version

Personnel
Joakim Berg – lyrics, music
Martin Sköld – music
Zmago Smon (Zed) – producer, mixing
Tim Young – mastering

Charts

Swedish

English

References 

1997 albums
Kent (band) albums